Juan de Torquemada, O.P. (1388 – 26 September 1468), (church Latin Johannes de Turre cremata, various spellings), Spanish ecclesiastic, defender of Jewish conversos, has been described as the most articulate papal apologist of the fifteenth century.  He was an uncle of Tomás de Torquemada, afterwards notorious as the persecuting Grand Inquisitor.

Life
Juan de Torquemada was born in Valladolid, Spain. “There is a general historical consensus that the family were former Jews“. Though those converso origins are very often stated without providing any source, they are “based primarily on Hernando del Pulgar’s statement that Juan de Torquemada’s abuelos were converts from the Jewish faith“. As a converso, Pulgar is considered to have made this assertion out of hate for Juan de Torquemada’s nephew, Tomás de Torquemada. However, through a study of all Juan de Torquemada’s ancestors no such jewish converts were found in his family. At an early age he joined the Dominican Order, and soon distinguished himself for learning and devotion. In 1415 he accompanied the general of his order to the Council of Constance. Thereafter he proceeded to the University of Paris for study, and took his doctor's degree in theology in 1423. After teaching for some time in Paris, he became prior of the Dominican house in Valladolid, and then in Toledo.

Torquemada attended the Council of Basel (1431–1449) as a representative of his order and of the King of Castile.  At the Council of Basel he was one of the ablest supporters of the viewpoint of pope Eugene IV and the Roman curia. He was rewarded with the office of Master of the Sacred Palace (4 March 1435), and later with a cardinal's hat in 1439. Torquemada participated in the Council of Florence, speaking on theological issues involving the eastern churches and defending papal primacy in a debate with Cardinal Giuliano Cesarini.  He also worked on behalf of Pope Eugene on missions to Germany and France before settling in the Roman curia.  As Cardinal of San Sisto, Torquemada supported papal Crusade policy  in opposition to the Ottoman Turks.  

In 1449 Toledo an unpopular tax law caused an insurrection against a weak government, during which a mob burned the house of a "new Christian" tax collector.  (These "new Christians", or conversos, were persons of Jewish descent professing Christianity; their sincerity was doubted by some.)  A faction led by one Pedro Sarmiento imposed a law that deprived conversos of government and church posts and disqualified them from testifying in legal proceedings.  The legal status of conversos thus came into question.   The dispute spread outside Castile and came to the attention of Pope Nicholas V.  On the urging of Torquemada the Pope issued a bull condemning discrimination against conversos; he excommunicated Sarmiento and some of his followers. In 1450 Torquemada published a tract — a "sharp and relentless" theological attack — in which he labelled Sarmiento and his followers as Midianites and Ishmaelites, the biblical enemies of the Israelite people, comparing them to the evil persecutor Haman.  Torquemada's defence of conversos was successful in Rome, but not eventually in Castile. (Juan de Torquemada was an uncle of the Inquisitor, Tomás de Torquemada.  It has been argued that the latter's persecution of crypto-Jews was motivated by a sense of insecurity about his own origins.)

Torquemada has been described as the most articulate papal apologist of the fifteenth century.  The medieval papacy's supremacy was challenged both by Hussites (early Protestants) and by conciliarists (who held that an ecumenical council of the Church had more authority than a pope).  The Council of Basel had attempted to depose Pope Eugenius IV.  Torquemada attacked both these positions in his Summa de ecclesia (1453).

Torquemada promoted reform of religious houses of his order and of monasteries. In 1456, the new Pope Callixtus III, aka Alfonso de Borja, gave him, in commendam,  the position of Abbot of the monastery of Santa Scolastica in Subiaco. This connection may explain his interest in the importation of printing into Rome. The cardinal wrote extensively on behalf of papal primacy.  Most notably, his Summa de ecclesia defended the Church against the Hussites and the Roman pontiff against conciliarism.

Torquemada became cardinal priest of Santa Maria in Trastevere (1446-1460), then cardinal bishop of Palestrina (1460-1463), and last cardinal bishop of Sabina (1463-1468). He participated in four papal elections, casting the deciding vote in the election of Pope Nicholas V (1447–1455).  
He died at Rome in 1468 and was buried at Santa Maria sopra Minerva.

A painting by Antoniazzo Romano showing the Annunciation has in its background Torquemada presenting girls who received dowry funds from a guild he founded to the Virgin Mary.  (At an earlier  age he was painted by Fra Angelico in a Crucifixion scene now at Harvard University's Fogg Museum.)

Works

Torquemada's principal works are:

Meditationes, seu Contemplationes devotissimae (Rome, 1467)
In Gratiani Decretum commentarii (4 vols., Venice, 1578)
Expositio brevis et utilis super toto psalterio (Mainz, 1474)
Quaestiones spirituales super evangelia totius anni (Brixen, 1498)
Symbolum pro informatione Manichaeorum (El bogomilismo en Bosnia) (Publicaciones del Seminario Metropolitano de Burgos. Serie B)
 Tractatus contra Madianitas et Ismaelitas: defensa de los judíos conversos, (Publicaciones del Seminario Metropolitano de Burgos. Serie B, v. 2) (Burgos, 1957).Summa ecclesiastica (Salamanca, 1550) [or Summa de ecclesiastica potestate] or "Summa de ecclesia (Summa de Ecclesia una cum eiusdem apparatu nunc primum in lucem edito, super decreto Papae Eugenii IIII in concilio Florentino de Unione Graecorum - Venetiis [Venice]: apud Michaelem Tramezinum, 1561).6}
The Summa de ecclesia has the following topical books:#De universa ecclesiaDe Ecclesia romana et pontificis primatuDe universalibus conciliisDe schismaticis et haereticis (divided into two parts, on schism & on heresy).

His De conceptione deiparae Mariae, libri viii. (Rome, 1547), was edited with preface and notes by E. B. Pusey (London, 1869 seq.) in opposition to Pope Pius IX's definition of the dogma of the Immaculate Conception.

Other works include polemical tracts and sermons.

Torquemada's Meditationes'' was the first illustrated book published in Italy. The first edition of the book was published in 1467 in Rome by Ulrich Han.

See also

Notes

References

,

External links
 
From the Lessing J. Rosenwald Collection at the Library of Congress
Meditationes, seu Contemplationes devotissimae. Mainz Johann Neumeister, 3 Sept. 1479. 
Meditationes, seu Contemplationes devotissimae. Rome, Stephan Plannck, 13 Mar. 1484.

1388 births
1468 deaths
Spanish Dominicans
Dominican cardinals
Dominican theologians
15th-century Roman Catholic bishops in Castile
15th-century Spanish writers
15th-century Castilian cardinals
Cardinal-bishops of Albano
Cardinal-bishops of Palestrina
Cardinal-bishops of Sabina
Bishops of Ourense